Sentraal-Suid Koöperasie (SSK) is an agricultural cooperative founded in 1931 by farmers in the Overberg region of South Africa. Originally known as the Swellendam-Heidelberg Koöperasie, the name was changed to its current form in the 1980s. The head office of SSK is situated in Swellendam, the third oldest town of the Republic of South Africa.

History

The Prime Minister of South Africa at the time, General J. B. M. Hertzog, called for the creation of the Suid Afrikaanse Sentrale Koöperatiewe Graanmaatskappy in 1930 as a response to the need of resources by local farmers. This system of co-operatives was thus started by the then Minister of Agriculture, General Jan Kemp.

On July 15, 1931, the first founders meeting was held to start the co-operative then known as the Swellendamse Boere Koöperatiewe Vereniging (Swellendam’s Farmers Co-operative Society) attendees were:

P.G. Lourens
F.J. van Eeden
M.C. Dippenaar
J.H.K. van Blommestein
F.J. Linde and
D.C. van Dyk

At the second meeting held ten days later the following people joined in,
M.J. Streicher
D.H. van Papendorp
and P.J. de Wet

Mr. van Blommestein the only person amongst the “Directors”, who had a University degree in law took the lead and were also elected as the first Chairmen. The start was a worrying affair and already ten days after the founding of the new institution member P.J. de Wet resigned.

See also
 Agriculture in South Africa

References 

Dr Joan Prins. Werk Saam Wen Saam.1991.Cape Town.

External links 
 
 Soill

Agricultural cooperatives
Agriculture companies of South Africa
Food and drink companies established in 1931
1931 establishments in South Africa
Cooperatives in South Africa
Economy of the Western Cape